Don't Forget Who You Are is the  second studio album by indie-rock musician Miles Kane. It was released on 3 June 2013 under Columbia Records. The album title is named from the second song off the album, "Don't Forget Who You Are" and featured on EA Sports' EA Trax in the video game FIFA 14, while "Give Up" is featured in EA Sports UFC.

Track list

References

2013 albums
Columbia Records albums
Miles Kane albums
Albums produced by Ian Broudie